Mattei Dogan (16 October 1920 – 10 October 2010) was a Romanian-born French political sociologist and senior research officer emeritus of the French National Center for Scientific Research (CNRS) and professor emeritus of political science of the University of California, Los Angeles. Over a period of 22 years, he also taught at UCLA, Indiana University, Yale University, the Institute of Statistical Mathematics in Tokyo, the University of Florence, and the Russian Academy of Sciences. He was a foreign honorary member of the Romanian Academy from 1992, and he received the CNRS Silver Medal.

He chaired the Research Committee on Political Elites of the International Political Science Association (IPSA) and the Research Committee on Comparative Sociology of the International Sociological Association (ISA).  He was also the founder of the Foundation Mattei Dogan that is devoted exclusively to the social sciences, and which is recognized as a non-profit organization by both the French and American governments.

Works

His main research domains include elite studies, international comparative analysis, and interdisciplinary approaches.  His publications have dealt with the relationship between political behavior and religious behavior, political legitimacy and the ruling class.  He also worked on the society and political regime of Italy.

His professional itinerary was marked by his affiliation with the Committee on Political Sociology (ISA and IPSA), which played a pioneering role in comparative research and where he was in the company of scholars like Giovanni Sartori, Seymour Martin Lipset, Stein Rokkan, Richard Rose, Juan Linz, and other comparativists.  During his long career, which spanned more than a half-century, he moved from empirical research on topics like voter behavior to more encompassing theoretical work, his last publication being "Is There A Ruling Class in France?".

Publications

 Dogan, Mattei (ed.), "Political Mistrust and the Discrediting of Politicians," Leiden: Brill, 2005
 Dogan, Mattei (ed.), "Elite Configurations at the Apex of Power," Leiden: Brill, 2003
 Dogan, Mattei., "Paradigms in the Social Sciences," in International Encyclopedia of the Social and Behavioral Sciences, Volume 16, 2001
 Dogan, Mattei., "Political science and the other social sciences," in A new handbook of political science, 1996

References

External links 
 Website of the Foundation Mattei Dogan

} 87234
French sociologists
1920 births
2010 deaths
Romanian emigrants to France
University of California, Los Angeles faculty
Indiana University faculty
Yale University faculty
Academic staff of the University of Florence
Honorary members of the Romanian Academy